Demetrida fasciata is a species of ground beetle in Lebiinae subfamily. It was described by Sloane in 1915 and is endemic to Australia.

References

Beetles described in 1915
Beetles of Australia
fasciata